Michael Barry is a Canadian actor known for his roles in Dawn of the Dead, Last Night and Detroit Rock City.

Filmography

Film

Television

References

External links

Living people
20th-century Canadian male actors
21st-century Canadian male actors
Canadian male film actors
Canadian male television actors
Canadian male voice actors
Year of birth missing (living people)
Place of birth missing (living people)